Mount Twynam is a mountain located on the Main Range, part of the Great Dividing Range, in the Snowy Mountains in New South Wales, Australia. The mountain is located close the border between New South Wales and Victoria.

The mountain is large but unimposing, and has good and far-reaching views over Blue Lake Cirque and the Western Falls. Despite being relatively accessible by track, it is rarely visited. The mountain forms a watershed for the Snowy River to the southeast and the Geehi River to the northwest.

Gallery

See also

 Australian Alps
 List of mountains in New South Wales

References

Seven Third Summits
Twynam
Snowy Mountains